Events from the year 1872 in Scotland.

Incumbents

Law officers 
 Lord Advocate – George Young
 Solicitor General for Scotland – Andrew Rutherfurd-Clark

Judiciary 
 Lord President of the Court of Session and Lord Justice General – Lord Glencorse
 Lord Justice Clerk – Lord Moncreiff

Events 
 May
 Rangers F.C., founded in March as an Association football club in Glasgow by brothers Moses and Peter McNeil, Peter Campbell and William McBeath, play their first ever game on the public pitches of Glasgow Green, a goalless draw against Callander
 John Kibble's conservatory is dismantled at Coulport for re-erection in Glasgow Botanic Gardens
 9 July – Tradeston Flour Mills explosion in Glasgow kills 18
 10 August – First Education (Scotland) Act passed, providing compulsory English-language education for all aged 5–13
 19 August – First horse trams in Glasgow, running from St George's Cross to Eglinton Toll
 2 October – Kirtlebridge rail crash at Kirtlebridge station on the Caledonian Railway in Dumfries and Galloway: 12 killed in a collision
 30 November – Scotland v England, the first FIFA-recognized international football match, takes place at Hamilton Crescent in Glasgow; the result is a goalless draw
 12 December – Third Lanark A.C. is established as the Association football team of the Third Lanarkshire Rifle Volunteers
 December – Wick Harbour breakwater is washed away in a storm
 Dhu Heartach lighthouse is first lit
 David Colville & Sons open their Dalzell Steel and Iron Works at Motherwell
 Guard Bridge paper mills established near Leuchars
 The Egyptian Halls, a pioneering iron-framed commercial building in Glasgow designed by Alexander Thomson, is completed
 The last Thurso Castle is built
 Clydebank High School established
 First hospital built on the site at Govan (Glasgow) that will become Queen Elizabeth University Hospital
 The Northern Psalter and Hymn Tune Book edited by William Carnie is published in Aberdeen containing Jessie Seymour Irvine's setting of Psalm 23, "Crimond"
 The Scottish Gaelic magazine Féillire is first published as Almanac Gàilig air son 1872 in Inverness
 The Shetland Times is first published in Lerwick
 Other Association football clubs established this year include Ayr Thistle, Clydesdale, Dumbarton and Renton

Births 
 12 February – Alexander Gibb, civil engineer (died 1958)
 5 May – Norman Smith, philosopher (died 1958)
 13 June – Chrystal Macmillan, mathematician, suffragist, politician, barrister and pacifist (died 1937)
 2 October – Thomas Hunter, Unionist Party MP for Perth (1935–45) (died 1953)

Deaths 
 14 January – Greyfriars Bobby, faithful Skye Terrier dog
 27 February – John McLeod Campbell, minister and theologian (born 1800)
 16 June – Norman Macleod, Church of Scotland minister (born 1812)
 20 August – William Miller, poet (born 1810)
 28 November – Mary Somerville, scientist (born 1780)
 24 December – William John Macquorn Rankine, pioneer of thermodynamics (born 1820)

See also 
 Timeline of Scottish history
 1872 in the United Kingdom

References 

 
Years of the 19th century in Scotland
Scotland
1870s in Scotland